OMG may refer to:

 Oh my God (sometimes also Oh my Goodness or Oh my Gosh), a common abbreviation; often used in SMS messages and Internet communication

Acronyms
 OMG is the IATA code for Omega Airport, Omega, Namibia
 Operational manoeuvre group of the Soviet military
 Outlaw motorcycle gangs
 Order of Mapungubwe (Gold (OMG), for exceptional achievements)
 Oh My Gigabytes!, a Telkomsel Internet package
 One Man Gang wrestling

Books
OMG! Magazine, a news, entertainment and lifestyle magazine
Oh My Goddess!, a 1988 manga

Film and television
 OMG, I'm a Robot!, a 2015 Israeli film
 OMG – Oh My God!, a 2012 film
 Oh My Ghost (TV series), a 2015 South Korean television series
 Oh My God (Louis C.K. special), 2013
 OMG (Oh, My Girl!), a 2009 romantic comedy film  directed by Dante Nico Garcia

Games
 OMG (eSports), a Chinese League of Legends gaming team
 OMGcon, an anime/gaming convention in Kentucky, US

Music

Bands
 OMG (group) (Officially Miss Guided), a teenage American girl group
 Oh My Girl, a South Korean girl group
 Old Man Gloom, an American extreme metal band

Albums
 OMG (album), Rusko
OMG (single album), NewJeans

Songs
 "OMG (Oh My Gosh)", the 2009 song by Sabrina Washington
 "OMG" (Usher song), the 2010 song by Usher
 "OMG" (Camila Cabello song), the 2017 song by Camila Cabello
 "OMG" (Gryffin and Carly Rae Jepsen song), the 2019 song by Gryffin and Carly Rae Jepsen
 "OMG" (Koda Kumi song), the 2019 song by Koda Kumi
 "OMG" (NewJeans song), the 2023 song by NewJeans
 "O.M.G", by Jenna Rose
 "OMG (Oh My God)", by TaeTiSeo from Twinkle
 "OMG", by Little Mix from Get Weird
 "OMG", by Arash
 "OMG!", single by German rapper Marteria
 "OMG", song by Sampa the Great
 "Oh My God" (Adele song), song by Adele

People
 O'Shea Jackson Jr., known by his stage name OMG, is an American actor, rapper and son of Ice Cube

Politics
 Orkney Manifesto Group, a political party based in Orkney, Scotland

Science and technology
 OMG (gene), encodes the oligodendrocyte-myelin glycoprotein in humans
 OMG particle, an ultra-high-energy cosmic ray observed in 1991
 Object Management Group, on computer industry standards
 OM Group, a chemistry firm based in Cleveland, Ohio, United States
 OpenMG, file format's filename extension

See also

 
 Oh My God (disambiguation)
 Oh my gosh (disambiguation)